The Rally for Education about Sustainable Development (REDD) is a political party in Mali. It contested the presidential election on 29 April 2007 with the candidate Sidibé Aminata Diallo, who took seventh place with 0.55% of the vote. Diallo is the first woman to ever contest a presidential election in the country.

The party contested the 2013 parliamentary elections, but failed to win a seat.

See also 
 Environmental issues in Mali

References

Political parties in Mali
Environmentalism in Mali